Pello Ruiz Cabestany (born March 13, 1962, in San Sebastián) is a Spanish former professional road racing cyclist.

Major results

1980
 1st  Pursuit, National Track Championships
1982
 1st 
 1st Stages 8b & 11 Vuelta a Guatemala
 1st Stage 2 
 2nd Overall 
 2nd Overall Cinturó de l'Empordà
1983
 1st Overall 
 1st Prologue Grand Prix Guillaume Tell
 2nd Overall Vuelta Ciclista a Navarra
 2nd Overall Volta a Tarragona
 2nd 
1984
 2nd Overall Volta a la Comunitat Valenciana
1st Stage 3
 3rd Overall Vuelta a Aragón
 4th Trofeo Masferrer
 6th Subida a Arrate
1985
 1st  Overall Tour of the Basque Country
 1st Stage 6 Vuelta a Colombia
 2nd Road race, National Road Championships
 4th Overall Vuelta a España
1st Stage 17
1986
 1st Stage 4 Tour de France
 2nd Overall Vuelta a Murcia
 3rd Overall Grand Prix du Midi Libre
1st Stage 3
 4th Subida al Naranco
 6th Overall Vuelta a España
 6th Overall Setmana Catalana de Ciclisme
 9th Overall Tour of the Basque Country
 10th Overall Volta a Catalunya
1st Stage 5b
1987
 1st Overall Vuelta a Murcia
1st Stages 3 & 5
 1st Gran Premio de Llodio
 1st Trofeo Luis Puig
 1st Stage 2 Vuelta a Castilla y León
 10th Clásica de San Sebastián
1988
 1st Stage 6 Tour Méditerranéen
 4th Trofeo Masferrer
 5th Overall Volta a Catalunya
 7th Subida al Naranco
1989
 1st Overall Volta a la Comunitat Valenciana
1st Stage 5b (ITT)
 3rd Overall Vuelta a Burgos
 5th Overall Tour de la Communauté Européenne
 7th Overall Vuelta Asturias
1990
 4th Overall Vuelta a España
1st Prologue & Stage 19
 7th Overall Tour of the Basque Country
1991
 6th Overall Vuelta a España
 10th Overall Route du Sud
1992
 5th Overall Vuelta a Castilla y León
1993
 1st Stage 3 Euskal Bizikleta
 7th Overall Tour de Romandie
1994
 6th GP Villafranca de Ordizia
 7th Clásica de San Sebastián

Grand Tour general classification results timeline

External links

Living people
Cyclists from the Basque Country (autonomous community)
Spanish male cyclists
1962 births
Spanish Tour de France stage winners
Spanish Vuelta a España stage winners
Sportspeople from San Sebastián